This is a list of Korean given names by type. Most Korean given names consist of two Sino-Korean morphemes each written with one hanja. There are also names with more than two syllables, often from native Korean vocabulary. Finally, there are a small number of one-syllable names. Originally, there was no legal limitation on the length of names, but since 1993, regulations in South Korea have prohibited the registration of given names longer than five syllable blocks, in response to some parents giving their children extremely long names such as the 16-syllable Haneulbyeollimgureumhaennimbodasarangseureouri.
Lists of hanja for names are illustrative, not exhaustive.

Names by common first and second syllables

G or k (ㄱ), n (ㄴ), d (ㄷ)

M (ㅁ), b (ㅂ)

S (ㅅ)

Vowels and semivowels (ㅇ)

J (ㅈ) and ch (ㅊ)

T (ㅌ) and h (ㅎ)

Native Korean names

Goyueo ireum are Korean given names which come from native Korean vocabulary, rather than Sino-Korean roots. These names have been used on occasion for centuries, but they only began to become widespread in South Korea in the late 20th century. However, this is not possible for all names; for example, for Ha-neul, there are no hanja with the reading "neul" on the South Korean government's official list of hanja which may be registered for use in given names.

Since the late 1970s, the frequency of parents giving their children names that are native Korean words, usually of two syllables, has increased. Popular given names of this sort include Haneul ("Heaven" or "Sky"), Areum ("Beauty"), Yiseul ("Dew") and Seulgi ("Wisdom"). Between 2008 and 2015, the proportion of such names among South Korean newborns rose from 3.5% to 7.7%. The most popular native names in 2015 were Hangyeol ("Unity") for boys and Sarang ("Love") for girls. Despite this trend away from traditional practice, people's names are still recorded in both hangul and hanja (if available) on official documents, in family genealogies, and so on.

There are also some mixed names: those in which a single name contains both a Sino-Korean element and a native Korean element.

Other names

This section is for names not included in the above sections. Names are listed in South Korean hangul alphabetical order.

Single-syllable names

See also
 Korean name
 List of the most popular given names in South Korea
 List of Korean family names
 List of South Korean surnames by prevalence
 List of most popular given names

References

Further reading

 
Korean
given names